Tākaka Hill is a range of hills in the northwest of the South Island of New Zealand. Made of marble that has weathered into many strange forms and with numerous sink holes, it is typical karst country. The marble is Ordovician in age and from the Takaka Terrane.

There is only one road winding over and around the flanks of Tākaka Hill, State Highway 60, following the valleys of the Tākaka River to the northwest and the Riuwaka River to the southeast. In July 2020, the name of the pass was officially gazetted as Tākaka Hill Saddle by the New Zealand Geographic Board.

It rises to 791 metres at its highest point and separates the coastal communities of Golden Bay from those of the more populous Tasman Bay / Te Tai-o-Aorere to the southeast and  because of its winding nature isolates Golden Bay from the rest of the South Island.

Tākaka Hill is notable for its (now defunct) marble quarry and for many limestone caves and sinkholes, including Ngarua Caves which are open to the public and feature deposits of moa bones. Harwood's Hole, at one time the deepest cave in New Zealand, is also to be found on Tākaka Hill.

Many of the caves drain into The Resurgence, a spring at the foot of the hill.

Tākaka Hill, as many other areas in and around the Golden Bay, has also been the location for many scenes filmed for The Lord of the Rings film trilogy.

Demographics

Takaka Hills had a population of 1,185 at the 2018 New Zealand census, an increase of 87 people (7.9%) since the 2013 census, and an increase of 42 people (3.7%) since the 2006 census. There were 435 households. There were 618 males and 570 females, giving a sex ratio of 1.08 males per female. The median age was 46.5 years (compared with 37.4 years nationally), with 195 people (16.5%) aged under 15 years, 156 (13.2%) aged 15 to 29, 624 (52.7%) aged 30 to 64, and 210 (17.7%) aged 65 or older.

Ethnicities were 91.4% European/Pākehā, 9.6% Māori, 1.8% Pacific peoples, 3.0% Asian, and 2.3% other ethnicities (totals add to more than 100% since people could identify with multiple ethnicities).

The proportion of people born overseas was 21.0%, compared with 27.1% nationally.

Although some people objected to giving their religion, 63.8% had no religion, 22.8% were Christian, 1.0% were Buddhist and 2.3% had other religions.

Of those at least 15 years old, 192 (19.4%) people had a bachelor or higher degree, and 165 (16.7%) people had no formal qualifications. The median income was $26,900, compared with $31,800 nationally. The employment status of those at least 15 was that 534 (53.9%) people were employed full-time, 159 (16.1%) were part-time, and 21 (2.1%) were unemployed.

References

External links
Caving areas in New Zealand

Hills of New Zealand
Landforms of the Tasman District
Golden Bay